Erik Seletto (born 21 September 1975) is an Italian former alpine skier who competed in the 1998 Winter Olympics.

National titles
Seletto has won two national titles.

Italian Alpine Ski Championships
Downhill: 1997
Super-G: 2003

References

External links
 

1975 births
Living people
Italian male alpine skiers
Olympic alpine skiers of Italy
Alpine skiers at the 1998 Winter Olympics
Alpine skiers of Fiamme Gialle
People from Aosta
Italian alpine skiing coaches